Songs My Father Left Me is the eleventh studio album by American musician Hank Williams Jr. The full title is Songs My Father Left Me The Poetry of Hank Williams, set to music and sung by Hank Williams Jr. The album was issued in 1969 by MGM Records as number SE 4621.

Track listing
All tracks composed by Hank Williams

Side One
 "Cajun Baby" – 2:38
 "For Me There is No Place" – 2:16
 "Is This Goodbye" – 2:05
 "I'm Just Crying 'Cause I Care" – 2:43
 "Your Turn to Cry" – 1:52
 "Where Do I Go From Here" – 2:21

Side Two
 "Are You Lonely Too" – 2:33
 "Homesick" – 2:24
 "Just Me and My Broken Heart" – 2:37
 "My Heart Won't Let Me Go" – 2:15
 "You Can't Take My Memories of You" – 2:43

References

External links
 Hank Williams Jr.'s Official Website

1969 albums
Hank Williams Jr. albums
Albums arranged by Bill McElhiney
MGM Records albums